The Jaugiliai (or Jaugėliai) is a lake in Krakės Eldership, Kėdainiai District Municipality, central Lithuania. It belongs to the Smilga basin (part of the Nevėžis basin) as the Smilga's tributary the Jaugila passes through the lake.

Coasts of the lake are flat, swampy. Nearby the western end of the lake another Rimkai Lake is located.

The name Jaugiliai comes from the village name Jaugiliai.

References

Lakes of Kėdainiai District Municipality